The 1937 Giro di Lombardia was the 33rd edition of the Giro di Lombardia cycle race and was held on 23 October 1937. The race started and finished in Milan. The race was won by Aldo Bini of the Bianchi team.

General classification

References

1937
Giro di Lombardia
Giro di Lombardia